Pablo Alejandro Francés (born September 29, 1982) is an Argentine footballer who currently plays for San Martín de Mendoza in the Torneo Argentino B.

References

External links
  

1982 births
Living people
Argentine footballers
Argentine expatriate footballers
Argentine expatriate sportspeople in Indonesia
Oriente Petrolero players
Club Destroyers players
Persib Bandung players
Persijap Jepara players
San Marcos de Arica footballers
Primera B de Chile players
Liga 1 (Indonesia) players
Expatriate footballers in Chile
Expatriate footballers in Bolivia
Expatriate footballers in Indonesia
Association football forwards
Footballers from Córdoba, Argentina
21st-century Argentine people